Nevermore 2023 (also stylized as Nevermore 2023 | Tournée des stades) is the sixth concert tour and eighth series of concerts by French recording artist and songwriter Mylène Farmer, launched in support of her twelfth studio album, L'Emprise. It is scheduled to start on 3 June 2023 at Stade Pierre-Mauroy in Lille, and is set to conclude on 29 July 2023 at Allianz Riviera in Nice. It will be the singer's first tour to take place completely in stadiums, and her first concert tour since Timeless 2013.

The tour was first announced on 22 June 2021, after media speculation and online teasers posted on Farmer's YouTube channel. The tour was also set to visit Russia in August or September, but no dates were announced. On 21 March 2022, the Russian concerts were cancelled in light of the Russian invasion of Ukraine.

The concert tour has been commercially successful. Initially, eleven dates were announced. Tickets were put on sale on 1 October 2021. In the first two hours, 100,000 tickets were sold, prompting the organisers to schedule second additional dates in some cities, bringing the total number of shows to 14. As of November 2022, 550,000 tickets were sold.

Background and development 
Following the release of Farmer's eleventh studio album, Désobéissance, Farmer announced her seventh series of concerts entitled Mylène Farmer 2019. The residency at Paris La Défense Arena proved to be a commercial success; Farmer performed 9 concerts in front of 235,000 spectators. In addition, it was the ninth best-selling show of 2019 for a female vocalist, with a total revenue of $31,700,000. Despite the commercial success, several critics speculated that it would be Farmer's last series of concerts.

On 9 June 2021, Farmer started teasing an upcoming project by changing the banner of her YouTube channel to a dark image which read MF-NM. On 10 June, Farmer uploaded a video showing a raven's eye on YouTube, where the word Nevermore was first mentioned. On 13 June, a new video was uploaded, featuring a photo of Farmer taken for the live album En concert in the raven's eye, with the title Nevermore 2023. The tour was officially announced on 22 June.

Thierry Suc, Farmer's manager, disclosed in November 2022 that construction of the sets would begin shortly. Le Parisien reported that 90 semi-trailers will be needed for the tour and also announced that long-time collaborator Laurent Boutonnat would not be serving as creative director.

Commercial performance 
Farmer unveiled the initial tour dates on 22 June 2021, with the intention of playing eleven stadium concerts across cities France, Switzerland and Belgium, and unspecified dates in Russia. An official website was set up to announce the dates. In August, a final tour date in Nice was added. On 1 October, the official presale opened. In its first two hours, 100,000 tickets were sold, while 200,000 tickets were sold in the first eight hours of the pre-sale period. Tickets for the general public went on sale on 4 October 2021. In ten days, TS Productions reported that 340,000 tickets had already been sold out of 500,000.

On 17 January 2022, both Nantes dates and dates in Lyon and Bordeaux were billed as sold-out. Thierry Suc, Farmer's manager disclosed that the concerts scheduled in Russia had been cancelled due to the 2022 Russian invasion of Ukraine. The initially-announced first date at Stade de Genève was cancelled on 16 August 2022 due to the relaxations of the COVID-19 safety measures in Switzerland, which had originally meant that only 50% of seats had been put on sale for each of the two concerts.

In September 2022, the organisers reported that 400,000 tickets had already been sold and five dates had been completely sold-out, prompting them to add a second date in Lyon and Bordeaux, bringing the total number of concerts to 13. As of November 2022, seven dates were completely sold out and 550,000 tickets had been sold.

Shows

References

Mylène Farmer concert tours
2023 concert tours